Ireland has been participating at the Deaflympics since 1973 and  has earned a total of 42 medals.

Ireland has never participated at the Winter Deaflympics.

Medal tallies

Summer Deaflympics

See also
Ireland at the Paralympics
Ireland at the Olympics

References

External links
Deaflympics official website
2017 Deaflympics

Nations at the Deaflympics
Parasports in Ireland
Deaf culture in Ireland